The Sardinian (or ) is a breed of donkey from the Mediterranean island of Sardinia, to the west of Italy. It is raised throughout the island; there are also some small populations in mainland Italy. It is one of the eight autochthonous donkey breeds of limited distribution recognized by the Ministero delle Politiche Agricole Alimentari e Forestali, the Italian ministry of agriculture and forestry. Its conservation status was listed as "endangered" by the FAO in 2007.

References

Donkey breeds originating in Italy
Donkey breeds
Sardinia